Mohieddin El-Sas (born 2 February 1950) is a Syrian wrestler. He competed in the men's Greco-Roman 48 kg at the 1972 Summer Olympics.

References

1950 births
Living people
Syrian male sport wrestlers
Olympic wrestlers of Syria
Wrestlers at the 1972 Summer Olympics
Place of birth missing (living people)